Christa Jansohn (born 1958) is a German scholar of English literature and culture. She is Chair of British Culture at the University of Bamberg in Germany.

Education

Christa Jansohn studied English, History and Archive Studies at the University of Bonn and the University of Exeter. She completed her MA, PhD, and ‘Habilitation’ at the University of Bonn.

Career

Since 2001, she has been Professor of British Culture at the University of Bamberg, Bavaria. Her work has focused primarily on the intersections between British Cultural Studies and older philological traditions, as well as on interdisciplinary approaches to these overlaps. She has made particular contributions in a number of different areas, including the reception of Shakespeare in Germany; D. H. Lawrence and his European reception; the relationship between literature and the history of science and medicine; the history of literary societies; scholarly editing (with a particular focus on Shakespeare and Lawrence); and translation studies.

Christa Jansohn has been a full member of the Academy of Sciences and Literature, Mainz since 2005, and since 2011 has served as Chair of the Academy’s Committee for English Literature. In 2019, she was appointed Chair of the Commission of Literature and Culture at the Academy; and in July 2019, she was elected a full member of the section of 'Literary and Theatrical Studies' in the Academia Europaea. She also serves on the Editorial Boards of the journals Archiv für das Studium der neueren Sprachen und Literaturen and the Prague Journal of English Studies.

Awards and honours

Christa Jansohn has been a visiting fellow of several colleges of the University of Cambridge, most recently Trinity (2005) and Churchill (2010–11, 2015–16). In 2009 she was a visiting fellow at CRASSH (Centre for Research in the Arts, Social Sciences, and Humanities), Cambridge.

Among other research sabbaticals at US institutions, she has been a Fulbright Fellow at New York University (1992); an Andrew W. Mellon Foundation Fellow at the Harry Ransom Humanities Research Center, University of Texas at Austin (1994); and an Eleanor M. Garvey Fellow in Printing and Graphic Arts at the Houghton Library, Harvard University (2016).

In 2004 she was awarded the Commerzbank Prize of the Academy of Sciences and Literature, Mainz, for her “wide-ranging, many-sided, and remarkably fruitful research activities, which have advanced and enriched dialogue with Anglo-Saxon scholarship”.

References

Major publications

Kriegsende in Weimar 1945. Die thüringische Landeshauptstadt während der amerikanischen Besetzung im April/Mai 1945. Dokumente und Berichte, co-authored with Volker Wahl (Jena: Vopelius, 2020), pp. 376, including numerous illustrations and reproductions. . 
"Brexit Means Brexit?' The Selected Proceedings of the Symposium, Akademie der Wissenschaften und der Literatur | Mainz, 6–8 December 2017. Ed. Christa Jansohn (Mainz: Akademie der Wissenschaften und der Literatur, 2018). Pp. 162. [Please click here for the online publication.]
 D. H. Lawrence: Lady Chatterley: Übersetzt von Georg Goyert. Ed. (1st edn) by Guido Huss and Christa Jansohn on the occasion of the fiftieth anniversary of the translator's death, with a Foreword by Christa Jansohn (E-Books: Kindle, Tolino, 2016). ISBN Nummer: Kindle (mobile format): 9783944561530, ISBN: Tolino (E-publication format): 9783944561523.
 "Bücher sind nur dickere Briefe an Freunde": Festgabe für Michael Knoche. 25 Jahre Bibliotheksdirektor der Herzogin Anna Amalia Bibliothek (1991-2016). Ed. Christa Jansohn und Freunde Michael Knoches (Studien zur englischen Literatur und Wissenschaftsgeschichte, 29). Münster: LIT, 2016. Pp. 265.
 Shakespeare unter den Deutschen. Ed. Christa Jansohn with Werner Habicht, Dieter Mehl, und Philip Redl (Stuttgart: Franz Steiner, 2015). Pp. 343.
 Shakespeare Jubilees on three Continents. Ed. Christa Jansohn and Dieter Mehl (Studien zur englischen Literatur, 27). Münster: LIT, 2015. Pp. 383.
 Zu Pest und AIDS in der englischen Literatur. Stuttgart: Franz Steiner, 2012. Pp. 106. [Please click here for the online publication.]
 Eta Harich-Schneider: Die Sonette William Shakespeares und die Lyrik der "Rekusanten". Erlebnisse und Übersetzungen einer reisenden Musikerin: 1941-1982. Studien zur englischen Literatur, 25 (Münster: LIT-Verlag, 2011). Pp. 492 + 32 Illustr.
 Shakespeare without Boundaries. Festschrift in Honor of Dieter Mehl. Ed. Christa Jansohn, Lena Orlin, Stanley Wells (Newark: Delaware Press, 2011), Pp. 397.
 Shakespeare's World: World Shakespeare. The Selected Proceedings of the International Shakespeare Association World Congress, Brisbane 2006. Ed. Richard Fortheringham, Christa Jansohn, Robert White (Newark: Delaware Press, 2008). Pp. 436.
 The Reception of D.H. Lawrence in Europe. Ed. Christa Jansohn and Dieter Mehl. The Athlone Critical Tradition Series: The Reception of British Authors in Europe (London: Continuum International Publishing Group Ltd., 2007). Pp. xliii + 367.
 German Shakespeare Studies at the Turn of the Twenty-first Century. Ed. Christa Jansohn (Newark: Delaware Press, 2006). Pp. 308.
 In the Footsteps of William Shakespeare. Ed. Christa Jansohn. Studien zur englischen Literatur, 19 (Münster: LIT, 2005). Pp. vi + 295.
 Elizabeth I: Past and Present. Ed. Christa Jansohn. Studien zur englischen Literatur, 19 (Münster: LIT, 2004). Pp. vi + 295.
 Old Age and Ageing in British and American Culture and Literature. Ed. Christa Jansohn. Studien zur englischen Literatur, 16 (Münster: LIT, 2004). Pp. 265.
 Zweifelhafter Shakespeare. Zur Geschichte der Shakespeare-Apokryphen und ihrer Rezeption von der Renaissance bis zum 20. Jahrhundert (Studien zur englischen Literatur, 11). Münster: LIT, 2000. 447 S.
 Problems of Editing. Beihefte zur editio, 14. Ed. Christa Jansohn (Tübingen: Max Niemeyer, 1999). Pp. vii + 250.
 D.H. Lawrence: The First and Second Lady Chatterley Novels (The Cambridge Edition of the Letters and Works of D.H. Lawrence). Cambridge: Cambridge University Press, 1999. Pp. xl + 690. Part I: First Version (Jansohn); Second Version (Dieter Mehl).
 D.H. Lawrence: The Woman Who Rode Away and Other Stories (The Cambridge Edition of the Letters and Works of D.H. Lawrence). Cambridge: Cambridge University Press, 1995. Pp. lxv + 488 [together with Dieter Mehl]. - Also published in "Penguin Twentieth-Century Classics" (London, 1996).
 William Shakespeare: A Lover's Complaint. Deutsche Übersetzungen von 1787 bis 1894. Herausgegeben und eingeleitet von Christa Jansohn. Mit einem Vorwort von Wolfgang Weiß (Berlin: Erich Schmidt, 1993). 238 S. + 4 Abb.
 Shakespeares Sonette in der Übersetzung Dorothea Tiecks. Kritisch herausgegeben von Christa Jansohn (Francke Monographien). Tübingen: Francke, 1992. vii + 371 S.
 Zitat und Anspielung im Frühwerk von D. H. Lawrence (Studien zur englischen Literatur, 1). Münster: LIT, 1990. ii + 298 S.

External links
 Christa Jansohn’s profile page at the Chair of British Culture at the University of Bamberg
 Christa Jansohn’s profile page at the Academy for Sciences and Literature, Mainz
 Works by Christa Jansohn at the German National Library
 Illustrating the History of Germany's Shakespeare Reception: the Birmingham Photo Album
 Archiv für das Studium der Neueren Sprachen und Literaturen 
 Editionen in der Kritik
 Shakespeares Sonette in Deutschland. Edited by Christa Jansohn with the assistance of Eymar Fertig.

Academic staff of the University of Bamberg
Living people
1958 births